

Publications

1990

1991

1992

 Sailor Moon by Naoko Takeuchi debuts in Nakayoshi.

1993

1994

Jack Kirby dies at age 76 of heart failure in his Thousand Oaks, California home.

1995

1996

The Avengers (volume 2) #1 – Marvel Comics
Captain America (volume 2) #1 – Marvel Comics
Fantastic Four (volume 2) #1 – Marvel Comics
Iron Man (volume 2) #1 – Marvel Comics
Onslaught: Marvel Universe – Marvel Comics
Onslaught: X-Men – Marvel Comics

1997

Heroes Reborn: The Return #1–4 – Marvel Comics
Onslaught: Epilogue – Marvel Comics
One Piece by Eiichiro Oda debuts in Weekly Shōnen Jump.

1998

The Avengers (volume 3) #1 – Marvel Comics
Captain America (volume 3) #1 – Marvel Comics
Fantastic Four (volume 3) #1 – Marvel Comics
Iron Man (volume 3) #1 – Marvel Comics

1999

Notes

References

 The Dark Age: Grim, Great & Gimmicky Post-Modern Comics (by Mark Voger, 168 pages, TwoMorrows Publishing)